Scopula halimodendrata is a moth of the family Geometridae described by Nikolay Grigoryevich Erschoff in 1874. It is found in Turkmenistan, Tajikistan and Kazakhstan.

References

Moths described in 1874
halimodendrata
Moths of Asia